The Glen Waverley Hawks Football Club is an Australian rules football team, started in 1973. It is based in the eastern suburbs of Melbourne, Victoria, Australia and is part of the Eastern Football League.  It has produced such AFL stars as the brothers Justin and Michael Pickering. In 2005 a senior club was established. The home ground of Glen Waverley Hawks was Capital Reserve, having recently relocated to Central Reserve located on Springvale Road.

Senior club history

Early Years (2005–2007)
The Glen Waverley Hawks Senior Football Club began in 2005 in Division 4 of the Eastern Football League. With a relatively young list in 2005 the club struggled winning only on game for the season. In 2006 they failed to win a game and then in 2007 they broke a 49-game losing streak against Surrey Park in Round 17. These early years resulted in two wins and three consecutive wooden spoons. However this was the beginning of a developing list which would mature into a competitive football side with age.

Success Without Premierships (2008–2012)

The years 2008-2012 were a successful time for the Glen Waverley Hawks. They played in the finals in each of these seasons including two Grand Finals (2011-2012). In 2008 they made the Preliminary Final, 2009 the Semi Final, 2010 the Semi Final before finally becoming the Minor Premier in 2011. After qualifying for the Grand Final via a 41 defeat of Ferntree Gully in the semi final they played Heathmont in the Grand Final. When the siren sounded for full-time the scores were tied and the game went to extra time with Heathmont winning by seven points. In 2012 the club moved into 3rd Division of the EFL and finished second after the home and away season. They qualified for the Grand Final after defeating Boronia in the preliminary final. However, a very strong North Ringwood side defeated Glen Waverley by 138 points, a record margin in EFL Grand Finals.

Rebuilding (2013–2014)

In 2013 the club moved into a rebuilding phase with a few departures from senior players, and a now aging list with some key players of the foundation team still playing. Former captain Azzopardi left the club mid season, just weeks after the departure of Mick Gaul as senior coach, and with many injuries to older players, this gave many young players the opportunity to play in the senior side. The senior side finished 10th on the Division 3 ladder in 2013. 2014 loomed as another year where the club will be developing young players for a future premiership assault, with the club going through the 2014 Division 3 season without a win. Injuries to key players Ryan Buttner and Wayne Magee also resulted in a lot of untried youths getting opportunities. The Glen Waverley Hawks found themselves relegated finishing 0-18 and heading to Division 4.

Rebuilding (2015–2017)
The 2015 Season began in Division 4 with a 101-point defeat at the hands of the Warrandyte Bloods. Round 2 saw a more respectable loss to another flag favorite, the Forest Hill Zebras. The Hawks then won 4 of the next 5 games to sit 4th on the Division 4 EFL Ladder after 7 rounds. The 2016 season marked a return to finals footy for the Glen Waverley Hawks, as they finished the home and away season in 4th place after a crucial last round victory against Forest Hill. Glen Waverley will meet opponents Donvale on Sunday, August 21 in an elimination final.

The Coming of Age (2018)
The 2018 season has been earmarked as a year when the club would attempt to stamp their authority on the Division 4 Competition. With off-season boom recruits (including Tim Cook) added to an already strong, young squad buoyed from previous years of toil, hard work and not much success, the Hawks went into the preseason confident they could make an impact. 
The season did not begin as planned, losing the first 2 games to flag fancies Whitehorse and East Burwood, but since then the Hawks have strung together an incredible run of 14 wins in a row, with 2 regular season games remaining. The club is in great hands on and off the field with brilliant leaders such as Senior Captain Jesse Dunne & Reserves captain Oliver Wisconsinturkey IV. Glen Waverley will take on Coldstream at home this weekend, August 11.

New Era (2022)

A new era for the Glen Waverley Football Netball Club began in September 2021, when the club announced that well decorated VAFA coach Brett Gatehouse was appointed for the 2022 Season. Coming from St. Mary's in the VAFA, Brett brought along quite a few players from his previous club and the hype around the place was exciting. Alongside Brett in the coaches box is Phil Buck, Bill Anderson and Scott Gatehouse as his assistant coaches. Current captain is Mitch Potts, with vice-captain D'Arcy Grant and deputies to be are Ash Black and Bailey Meyer.

Senior Coaches

Dean Warren (2005)

Bernie Ryan (2006)

Mark Fitt (2006–08, 2013)

Andy Owen (2009)

Mick Gaul (2010–13)

Ryan Flack (2014–2018)

Con Borg (2019)

Dylan Price (2020–2021)

Brett Gatehouse (2022)

Dean Warren (2023*-present)

Bernie Ryan was sacked following Round 7 2006 and Mick Gaul was sacked Following Round 11 2013. Mark Fitt was the replacement coach on both occasions.

Reserves Coaches

Scott Russell (2005)

John Tarquinio (2006–08)

Grant Rutley (2009)

Adrian Zandt (2010–11)

Wayne Van Der Ross (2012–13)*

Brad Matthews (2013-2017)*

Drew Withers (2018–2021)

Michael Lowe (2022-Present)

Wayne Van Der Ross Resigned as coach in Round 11 2013 and was replaced by Brad Matthews.

Colts Coach
Scott Russell (2006)
Luke Marchant (2008)
Peter Nash (2010)
Simon Grasser (2011–12)
Ray Sibly (2013)
Scott Gatehouse (2022-Present)

Senior Presidents
Gary Hocking (2005–09)
Steve Potts (2010–2016)
Gary Hocking (2017-2019)
Position not held in 2020
Matt Hollard (2021-Present)

VFL/AFL Players
Justin Pickering 
Michael Pickering.

See also
Eastern Football League (Australia)

References

External links
Glen Waverley Hawks Football Club

Australian rules football clubs in Melbourne
Australian rules football clubs established in 1973
Eastern Football League (Australia) clubs
1973 establishments in Australia
Sport in the City of Monash
Glen Waverley, Victoria